Miss International 2000, the 40th anniversary of the Miss International pageant, was held on October 4, 2000 at the Koseinenkin Hall in Tokyo, Japan. It was won by Vivian Urdaneta of Venezuela.

Results

Placements

Special awards

Contestants

  – Natalia Cecilia Dalla Costa
  – Carolina Fransisca Albertsz
  – Catherine Villarroel Márquez
  – Maria Fernanda Schneider Schiavo
  – Angeliki Lakouras
  – Carolina Cruz Osorio
  – Ana Gruica
  – Roselle Angèle Augusta
  – Nikoletta Violari
  – Markéta Svobodná
  – Hagar Ahmed El Taher
  – Kati Hannele Nirkko
  – Tatiana Micheline Bouguer
  – Doreen Adler
  – Dimitra Kitsiou
  – Liza Marie Leolini Camacho
  – Yazmin Alicia Di Maio Bocca
  – Carly Makanani Ah Sing
  – Alba Marcela Rubí Castellón
  – Edith Ho Wai Wong
  – Anna Lilja Björnsdóttir
  – Gayatri Anilkumar Joshi
  – Dana Farkash
  – Kanako Shibata
  – Son Tae-young
  – Sahar Mahmoud Al-Ghazzawi
  – Sanja Nikolik
  – Aida Stannis Kazum
  – Dominique Desira
  – Leticia "Letty" Judith Murray Acedo
  – Elena Andrej Ungureanu
  – Uma Bogati
  – Marynés Argüello César
  – Frida Agnethe Jonson
  – Eloisa Dilbodel Senior
  – Cristina Marie Sousa Broce
  – Joanna Maria Mijares Peñaloza
  – Emilia Ewelina Raszynska
  – Tânia Isabel Campanacho Ferreira
  – Rosiveliz Díaz Rodríguez
  – Svetlana Victorovna Goreva
  – Chiara Valentini
  – Lorraine Mann Loo Koo
  – Michaela Strählová
  – Irmari Steyl
  – Raquel Rovira González
  – Gabrielle Elisabeth Heinerborg
  – Hinarai Leboucher
  – Chiang Hsin-Ting
  – Phongkajorn Sareeyawat
  – Pamela Agnélé Gunn
  – Ismahero Lahmar
  – Hulya Karanlik
  – Yana Anatoliyivna Razumovska
  – Kirstin Anne Cook
  – Vivian Urdaneta

Notes

Did not compete

  – Nicola Jane Willoughby (World '99)
  – Evanna Marting
  – Inga Alspire
  – Maria Leticia Alvarez
  – Claudia Neyra
  – Alana Selby

Replacements
  – Lissette Blandó (over the 23-age limit)

References

External links
 Pageantopolis – Miss International 2000

2000
2000 in Tokyo
2000 beauty pageants
Beauty pageants in Japan